Gorgota is a commune in Prahova County, Muntenia, Romania. It is composed of five villages: Crivina, Fânari, Gorgota, Poienarii Apostoli and Potigrafu.

References

Communes in Prahova County
Localities in Muntenia